The Macau Legislative Assembly Building is the home of the Legislative Assembly of Macau and various government offices in Macau. The building is located in Sé, Macau, China.

Construction began in 1998 and was completed in 1999 for the handover. The building is triangular in shape and overlooks Nam Van Lake and within the Cathedral Parish. The assembly's hall overlooks the lake at the rear. The building is also home to:

 Administrative Offices
 Legislative Assembly member’s offices
 Archive and Library
 Auditorium
 Function Hall

The building was built by local architect Mario Duarte Duque, who also designed the 
Superior Court of Macau Building built next door.

Previous homes of the Legislative Assembly

Prior to the handover in 1999, the Assembly sat at the historic Leal Senado Building.

See also
 Legislative Council Complex in Hong Kong

External links

 Legislative Assembly Macau SAR of PRC

Legislative buildings in China
Landmarks in Macau
Government buildings in Macau
Sé, Macau
Government buildings completed in 1999
1999 establishments in Macau